How to Be Very, Very Popular is a 1955 comedy film written, produced and directed by Nunnally Johnson. The film starred Betty Grable in her final film role and Sheree North in her first leading role.

Johnson later said "I don't much like to think of How To Be Very, Very Popular because it brought fame and fortune to nobody. It was just a lousy mistake on everybody's part. "

Plot
Stormy Tornado and Curly Flagg are two showgirls from a San Francisco cabaret who witness the murder of one of their fellow performers and can identify the killer. Not wanting to get mixed up in a murder rap, the girls flee the scene and hide out at Bristol College, disguising themselves as boys. However the need for attention makes the girls want to stand out in their stage costumes and then the trouble begins.

The ladies hide in the room of Fillmore Wedgewood, who proudly calls himself "the world's oldest student", and is always looking for ways to forestall graduation and facing "the real world" outside.

College President Dr. Tweed tries to coax a sizeable donation from wealthy alumni B.J.Marshall. This proves difficult when Marshall is continually caught in the crossfire of the comical events that follow.

Cast

Betty Grable as Stormy Tornado
Sheree North as Curly Flagg
Bob Cummings as Fillmore "Wedge" Wedgewood
Charles Coburn as Dr. Tweed
Tommy Noonan as Eddie Jones
Orson Bean as Toby Marshall
Fred Clark as B.J. Marshall
Charlotte Austin as Midge
Alice Pearce as Miss "Syl" Sylvester
Rhys Williams as Cedric Flagg
Andrew Tombes as Sergeant Moon
Noel Toy as Cherry Blossom Wang
Emory Parnell as Police chief

Background
How to Be Very, Very Popular was the third adaptation derived from the 1933 novel She Loves Me Not by Edward Hope. The novel was first made into the 1934 Paramount comedy She Loves Me Not which starred Miriam Hopkins as Curly Flagg and co-starred Bing Crosby. That was then remade as True to the Army for Paramount in 1942. How to Be Very, Very Popular was based on the Broadway adaptation of She Loves Me Not by Howard Lindsay which was adapted from the original Edward Hope (Edward Hope Coffey) novel. It was also based on a second play, Sleep It Off, which was about a woman hypnotised for 24 hours.

It was written, produced and directed by Nunnally Johnson who had written and produced How to Marry a Millionaire. Johnson called Popular "an old fashioned farce. Wacky." He said he felt like making a comedy after doing two dramas, Night People and Black Widow.

The character of Curly Flagg was the lead in She Loves Me Not but was made the secondary character to Stormy Tornado in How to Be Very, Very Popular to accommodate Betty Grable. She had been the number one box office attraction throughout the 1940s and early 50s with her films making enormous amounts of money for 20th Century Fox.

Nunnally Johnson said he wrote the script for Grable and Marilyn Monroe who had previously starred together in How to Marry a Millionaire (1953) which is credited for basically creating the changeover in who was the top star at Fox. Grable was the top star in the 1940s and Monroe would become the top star of the 50s. However, there was no rivalry between the two bombshells, in fact Grable is said to have famously told Monroe, "go and get yours honey! I've had mine". The two became friends after that.

In December 1954 Fox announced the film would star Monroe. Sleep It Off was an alternative title. However Monroe refused to make the movie. In January 1955 the studio suspended her and replaced her with Sheree North who had been meant to appear in a film called Pink Tights.

Johnson said North had "been in the bull pen warming up too long and I'll hope she'll emerge from this a star. To date she's just been a threat but she's good looking and frank as they come."

Johnson later said in an interview he was "handed" North, and knew nothing about her. Johnson called the script "a mess, and Sheree, nice little woman, but unbelievably untalented. Untalented in the sense that she couldn't do this. [Johnson looks from left to right] You know;, she had to do this. [Johnson looks left, looks down, looks up to the left]. Her eyes would go down like this. I'd say, "Now; look, when you turn from him to her, can't you just look?" She says, "Isn't that what I'm doing?" I said, "No, this is what you're doing." With that kind of talent, it was hard to get anything out of her."

In the absence of Monroe, Fox offered the co starring role to Betty Grable. Robert Cummings then joined the cast.

Archer MacDonald was meant to play a key role but was hospitalised for ulcers and replaced by Tommy Noonan.

Johnson reflected "Betty was good as always, but its only distinction, if you want to call it that, is that I'm convinced that Billy Wilder pinched the plot." Wilder would make Some Like It Hot with Monroe, which had a similar plot..

Song credit
Song "How to Be Very, Very Popular" by Jule Styne and Sammy Cahn
Vocal Supervision    Ken Darby
Orchestration    Edward B. Powell        Skip Martin

Reception
At the time of its release, How to Be Very, Very Popular was greeted with mixed-to-positive press. Betty Grable's performance was generally praised, whereas newcomer Sheree North's performance drew less impressive notices. North appeared on the cover of LIFE just before the film's release. It enjoyed reasonable success, earning an estimated $1.65 million in rentals at the North American box office during its first year of release.

See also
List of American films of 1955

References

Notes

External links

How to Be Very, Very Popular at TV Guide (1987 write-up was originally published in The Motion Picture Guide)

1955 films
1955 comedy films
20th Century Fox films
American comedy films
Remakes of American films
American films based on plays
Cross-dressing in American films
Films based on American novels
Films directed by Nunnally Johnson
Films scored by Cyril J. Mockridge
Films set in universities and colleges
Films with screenplays by Nunnally Johnson
CinemaScope films
1950s English-language films
1950s American films